On September 17, 2007, a University of Florida student was stunned by police with a Taser at a forum featuring then–U.S. Senator John Kerry.

Kerry was addressing a Constitution Day forum at the University of Florida campus in Gainesville, which was organized by the ACCENT Speakers Bureau, an agency of the university's student government. Andrew Meyer, a 21-year-old fourth-year undergraduate mass communication student, had initially been allowed to ask a question after the close of the question period. He asked Kerry whether he was a member of the Skull and Bones society, and used the term "blowjob" in reference to the impeachment of Bill Clinton. Meyer was forcibly pulled away from the microphone. He was immediately restrained and forcibly removed and was subsequently arrested by university police. During his arrest, Meyer struggled and screamed for help. While six officers held Meyer down, one of the officers drive-stunned him with a taser following Meyer's shouted plea to the police, "Don't tase me, bro!"

Several videos of the episode were posted on the Web, with one version reaching eight million views on YouTube. The New Oxford American Dictionary listed tase or taze as one of the words of the year for 2007, popularized by the widespread use of the phrase. Meyer registered the phrase as a trademark in September 2007.

Details

Student 

Andrew Meyer was, at the time of the incident, an undergraduate student at the University of Florida. Born in Fort Lauderdale, Florida, he attended Cypress Bay High School in Weston, Florida, where he worked at the school newspaper, The Circuit, and was a member of the National Honor Society. At the University of Florida, Meyer worked as a columnist for the college paper Independent Florida Alligator. Meyer has stated that he writes "mostly whimsical nonsense columns about nothing in particular, yet occasionally finds [himself] angry enough to rain down fire and brimstone on an unsuspecting politician or celebrity."

He received international publicity when videos were posted of police tasering him at the town hall forum featuring Senator Kerry. The Miami Herald stated that "Meyer's grandmother, Lucy Meyer of Pembroke Pines, Florida, told The Miami Herald that he is a hardworking student with no prior run-ins with the law." She also said "He gets very, very overcome with passion for whatever he is feeling. Maybe the passion took over."

Today interviewed Meyer a month after the incident, once he had negotiated probation.

Meyer later attended the Florida International University College of Law, and registered "Don't tase me, bro" as a trademark in September 2007, using the publicity to sell T-shirts on his website. As of July 15, 2016, the phrase is no longer trademarked. Meyer wrote a book titled Don't Tase Me Bro! Real Questions, Fake News, and My Life As A Meme, which he published on Amazon in December 2018.

Incident prior to start of video 

According to reports, Meyer was in line for access to the microphone, when former Ambassador Dennis Jett, a University of Florida political science instructor and the forum's moderator, announced that one more question would be taken from the microphone on the right as seen from the stage. Meyer grabbed a second microphone which had been shut off, and demanded he be allowed to ask a question, asking, "Why don't you answer my questions? I have been waiting and listening to you speak in circles for the last two hours." He also stated, "These officers are going to arrest me," and "You will take my question because I have been listening to your crap for two hours." When an officer attempted to cut Meyer off and escort him out of the hall, Meyer broke away and continued to shout. Kerry then intervened and requested that Meyer be allowed to ask a question. Meyer was then brought back to the microphone with police officers on either side of him.

Meyer then handed his camera to the woman who was standing in front of him in line and requested that she record him. Kerry then finished answering a previous question, and Meyer was then recognized by Kerry to ask a question.

Video begins 

At this point, Meyer's video began. Meyer spoke for approximately 1 minute and 20 seconds, beginning by citing the book Armed Madhouse and its author Greg Palast's description of the 2004 U.S. presidential election and reports of election irregularities. According to The Washington Post, Meyer's question turned into "an increasingly agitated three-parter".

Meyer questioned Kerry's concession of the 2004 U.S. presidential election, Kerry's support or lack of support of the efforts to impeach George W. Bush, and Kerry's involvement in the Yale University secret society known as Skull and Bones.
After Meyer used the term "blowjob" (in reference to the impeachment of Bill Clinton) and while he was asking about Kerry's involvement in Skull and Bones, Meyer's microphone was cut off. Later, Steven Blank, ACCENT chairman, said, "We make it clear that any profanity and vulgarity by anyone asking questions will result in a cutting off of the mic."

Removal and arrest 

After Meyer's microphone was turned off, two University of Florida police officers attempted to take him away and arrest him. Steven Blank, ACCENT chairman, later said "They [the police] acted independently of ACCENT." Some members of the crowd began to cheer and applaud. Physical contact by the police occurred right after Meyer remarked, "Thank you for cutting my mic!" Kerry responded to the police action, "That's all right, let me answer his question," but two police officers continued to hold Meyer and attempted to forcibly move him towards the exit. Meyer repeatedly asked why he was being arrested. He struggled for several seconds shouting, "Get off me! What are you doing? What is going on?" while a third police officer kept a Taser aimed at him. Meyer managed to get back towards the stage and stated, "I want to stand and listen to the answers to my questions!" A fourth officer joined in, and single-handedly managed to remove Meyer to the back of the auditorium while being escorted by the three other officers. Meyer was carried part of the way by officer King, holding Greg Palast's book up in the air with his one free arm and shouting, "Why are you arresting me? Help! Help!" Close to the exit, Meyer broke free for a short moment and then was wrestled to the ground. Two more officers joined in and Meyer was now held down by four officers on the body and two on the legs. The officers managed to handcuff only one hand.

As Meyer requested to be allowed to leave of his own accord, they informed him that he no longer had a say in the matter and threatened several times to taser him if he did not comply. Meyer asked again to leave, and he yelled "Don't tase me, bro! Don't tase me!" but was drive-stunned (referred to in the police report as a "contact tase") in the shoulder by an officer with a department-issued X-26 Taser when he failed to comply.

Meyer continued screaming for help as the officers removed him from the room. During the altercation, Kerry urged everyone to calm down, joked that "Unfortunately, he [Andrew Meyer] is not available to come up here and swear me in as President" and continued his response to Meyer's question, which he referred to as "very important". Senator Kerry later released a statement saying that he was unaware that any Tasing had occurred until afterwards.

Meyer was then escorted off the premises and detained overnight in the Alachua County Jail. A large gathering of students protested outside the jail that evening.

Legal action 

After the incident, Meyer was arrested for inciting a riot and charged with resisting an officer and disturbing the peace and taken to Alachua County Jail. Meyer spent one night in the jail and was released the following morning. Police recommended charges of resisting arrest with violence, a felony, and disturbing the peace and interfering with school administrative functions, a misdemeanor.

Meyer's attorney, Robert S. Griscti, stated he would seek to have the charges dismissed. Meyer later issued a public apology for his "failure to act calmly", stating that he "stepped out of line". He initially insisted there was no reason for his arrest and demanded an apology from the Alachua County Police Department, although he sent written letters of apology to the University Police Department, as well as UF President Machen and the Gator Community. The state attorney agreed to drop prosecution of Meyer's case in return for Meyer serving a voluntary 18-month probation. If Meyer got into legal trouble during the probationary period, he was to be charged for the September 17 incident with resisting officers without violence and interfering with a school function. According to the University of Florida, Meyer also accepted sanctions from the University for violations of the Student Code of Conduct. The sanctions were not made public because of student privacy laws. He returned as a student in the spring semester of 2008.

Issues raised

Allegations of excessive force 

CNN.com stated that student opinions on the University of Florida campus were evenly divided as to whether the officers acted properly. About 300 students marched to the steps of campus police headquarters the following day with another 100 marching to Emerson Alumni Hall. They chanted that police used excessive force and waved signs that read "Stop police brutality", "Taze Pigs", "Freedom of Speech not a Felony", "Tasers Kill", and Meyer's words, "Don't Tase me, bro." They demanded that Tasers be banned from campus and that charges be filed against the police officers who restrained and tased Meyer. Four weeks after the incident the university sponsored a panel to discuss appropriate police practices. Fifteen people attended and one signed up to make comments.

Free speech issues 

Some critics of the actions of the police have suggested that it was not Meyer's actions which led to his removal, but the content of his remarks. For example, writer Palast said, "When you bring up uncomfortable stuff, it's going to create discomfort. Obviously, if he was speaking about baseball scores—if he maybe had a different political viewpoint that wasn't seen as combative or outside of what's permissible—then the cops' backs wouldn't have been up."

The American Civil Liberties Union's Florida chapter released a statement on September 18, 2007, expressing dismay over the incident.

Versions of the incident 

News articles about the incident stated that Meyer had posted on his website's numerous comedy videos. It was also pointed out that Meyer made arrangements to have himself filmed. Therefore, it was speculated that the incident may have been a stunt by Meyer. The reports cited Meyer's behavior when no cameras were present as evidence that the incident was a prank. The police report claimed that "as [Meyer] was escorted down stairs with no cameras in sight, he remained quiet, but once the cameras made their way down stairs he started screaming and yelling again." Additionally, the report asserts that Meyer was "laughing and being lighthearted in the car, his demeanor completely changed once the cameras were not in sight." The police officers involved in the arrest claimed that during the ride, Meyer said: "I am not mad at you guys, you didn't do anything wrong, you were just trying to do your job."

John Levy, a graduate student at the university and a friend of Meyer's since the second grade, has said that he spoke with Meyer shortly before Meyer entered the Kerry forum. He said that Meyer felt excited, had come up with several questions, and wanted to hear the senator's responses. Levy also said that Meyer was "really upset that people are more concerned with the police attack and not with the dialogue he was trying to start with Kerry" and that "What kind of message does that send? He wants to show students it's okay to ask hard questions, and then he gets tased for doing it." In the 2008 film Free For All, filmmaker John Ennis and Greg Palast (the author of the book Meyer was holding during the event) strongly echo this sentiment. When "asked about speculation that Meyer staged the confrontation", University spokesman Steve Orlando has stated that a member of the Office of Student Affairs told Orlando that Meyer brought a video camera to the forum and gave it to Clarissa Jessup, the young woman who was next in line to ask a question,<ref>[https://www.washingtonpost.com/wp-dyn/content/article/2007/09/23/AR2007092301286.html?nav=rss_politics 'Washington Postarticle Sept 24 "Got a Camera by Howard Kurtz]</ref> with whom he was unacquainted, before he spoke. Henry Perlstein, a university senior who has known Meyer since high school, said, "My first impression was that [the video] was a home movie he made for his friends because it was so surreal. Then I heard the screams and he sounded genuinely afraid." Amos Eshel, a fellow UF student who has known Meyer since middle school and who attended his arraignment in September 2007, later told reporters that Meyer does "like to speak his mind" but that Meyer is not the type of person who would attempt to start trouble.

 University investigation 

On September 18, in Emerson Alumni Hall, University of Florida President, J. Bernard Machen held a press conference about the incident. He also issued a letter in which he stated that the University Police Chief Linda Stump had requested that the Florida Department of Law Enforcement (FDLE) investigate the arrest. President Machen stated that "We plan to assemble a panel of faculty and students to review our police protocols, our management practices and the FDLE report to come up with a series of recommendations for the university." The State Attorney's Office will review the charges as well.The Miami Herald has stated that, at the press conference, President Machen called the situation "regretful for us" and announced that two officers involved in the incident had been placed on paid administrative leave pending the outcome of the probe. University spokesman Steve Orlando said Meyer was asked to leave the microphone after his allotted time was up. However, a transcript of the event shows that this is untrue; he was not told to leave at any point. The university president "would not say whether he thought the latest episode was a prank."

On October 24, the Florida Department of Law Enforcement released a report on its investigation of the incident. The report concluded that Meyer may have planned a 'disruption' of the forum. It also cleared the police officers involved of any wrongdoing in subduing Meyer, saying that the officer's actions were justified. University President Bernie Machen stated that "I have full confidence in the police department" and that the two officers previously placed on paid administrative leave have been fully reinstated.

 Response from Senator Kerry 

On the day following the incident, Kerry's office issued a statement:

 Popular culture 

The most viewed video of the taser incident, shot by Kyle Mitchell of The Gainesville Sun, has more than 8 million views on YouTube as of May 2021. The "Don't tase me, bro!" quote has become a catchphrase and Internet meme, spawning various parodies of the incident. The New Oxford American Dictionary listed "tase/taze" as one of the words of the year for 2007. The Yale Book of Quotations designated Meyer's exclamation as the most memorable quote of 2007. Time selected the video as one of YouTube's 50 Best Videos in March 2010. In addition,
 Mick Jones, former guitarist for The Clash, wrote and published a song inspired by the event titled "Don't Tase Me, Bro".
 New wave band Devo's song "Don't Shoot (I'm a Man)" from 2010 contains the lyric "They'll hunt you down and tase you, bro," and ends with the refrain "Don't tase me, bro!" In 2012, Devo recorded a song called "Don't Roof Rack Me, Bro! (Seamus Unleashed)," referring to then-presidential candidate Mitt Romney's road trip with his dog Seamus in a crate atop his vehicle.
 The quote was also used by nerdcore rapper MC Lars in his song "True Player for Real."
 Ben Folds Five used the phrase in their 2012 song "Erase Me".
 In an episode of truTV Presents: World's Dumbest..., after a clip showing a "sovereign citizen" refusing to release control of his camera before entering a courtroom and having a taser used on him, a "taze montage" was shown where it had part of the video where Meyer said the phrase and then being tasered.
 In The Boondocks episode "It's a Black President, Huey Freeman", Grandad utters the phrase before being tazed.
 In Total Drama World Tour's episode "The Ex-Files", Tyler references the event while seeing an alien by saying, "Don't probe me, bro!"
 In The Cleveland Show season 2 episode 5, "Little Man on Campus", both Cleveland Brown and Tim the Bear realize that Holt is in disguise in his high school persona. As Tim is about to maul him, a panicked Holt recites a series of media and internet memes, including "Don't Tase Me, Bro!"
 In The Amazing Spider-Man Spider-Man quotes the phrase after dodging a taser attack from a prison security guard.
 An episode of the 2010 TV series The Good Guys had an episode titled "Don't Tase Me, Bro" involving an incident with a taser, during which the character tased said, "Don't tase me, bro."
 An October 2010 comic strip by the webcomic Penny Arcade referenced the incident with the phrase "Don't stake me, bro", said by a creature from Castlevania: Lords of Shadow.
 In the 2014 video game Watch Dogs, the line appears as one of the various popular culture references and internet memes seen when the player hacks a billboard.
 In Elf Bowling, one of the elves used as a bowling pin yells, "Don't taze me, bro!"
 In the 2014 animated film Mr. Peabody & Sherman, Greek hero Agamemnon, voiced by Patrick Warburton, says, "Don't tase me, bro" after police use a taser to subdue French revolutionary Robespierre (voiced by Guillaume Aretos).
 In "Hundred Dollar Gus" of Uncle Grandpa, Mr. Gus blames Pizza Steve for whatever happens to him after Uncle Grandpa calls the cops, causing them to tackle him to the ground where he says the phrase before being tasered.
 In episode 47 of Sonic Boom (Fuzzy Puppy Buddies), Dave the intern is framed by Orbot and Cubot and is subsequently arrested. While being taken away, he pleads innocent and finishes with "Don't taze me, bro!" before going off-screen.
 In season 26 episode 12 "The Musk Who Fell to Earth" of The Simpsons, Homer says, "don't take me, bro" inside his car after Elon Musk asks him for more ideas.
 A Tom the Dancing Bug comic strip by Ruben Bolling outlines a fictional history of the expression.
 In the Android/iOS game Sky Force Reloaded, one of the unlockable technicians is called "Tase Mebro".
 In his album Solid State, Jonathan Coulton uses the phrase as part of the song "Don't Feed the Trolls".
 In the pilot episode of Bob's Burgers a protester can be seen with a sign that reads "Don't Taste Me Bro" in protest of Bob's alleged use of human flesh in his burger meat.
 Comedian Eric Andre utters the phrase when he is arrested at a town hall meeting in Season 2 Episode 5 of The Eric Andre Show.
 In season 5 episode 2 of Brooklyn Nine-Nine the character Jake Peralta says, "Don't taze me man, do you remember that, so funny...but don't" when being escorted from the warden's office by a guard.
 In the 2022 film Minions: The Rise of Gru'', Gru uses a Cheese-Ray on multiple customers in an ice cream parlor, causing the employee behind the counter to plead "Don't cheese me, bro."

See also 

Taser safety issues
Taser International – Taser Manufacturer
Braidwood Inquiry – Official Canadian enquiry into Tasers and similar devices
UCLA Taser incident
Robert Dziekański Taser incident
Student protest

References

External links 

Andrew Meyer's website
Press Release for Town Hall Forum
What What happened to Andrew Meyer?

2007 controversies in the United States
2007 in Florida
Controversies in Florida
Electroshock weapon controversies
Internet memes introduced in 2007
John Kerry controversies
Political events in Florida
September 2007 events in the United States
Taser
United States town halls
University of Florida
Viral videos